Lehtonen is a Finnish surname. Notable people with the surname include:

 Aatos Lehtonen (1914–1977), Finnish footballer and football manager
 Aleksi Lehtonen (1891–1951), Finnish archbishop
 Antero Lehtonen (born 1954), Finnish ice hockey player
 Antti Lehtonen (born 1993), Finnish ice hockey player
 Eero Lehtonen (1898–1959), Finnish pentathlete
 Eira Lehtonen (1939–1984), Finnish gymnast
 Erkki Lehtonen (born 1957), Finnish ice hockey player
 Eva Lehtonen (born 1991), Finnish swimmer
 Frans Lehtonen (1859–1920), Finnish blacksmith and politician
 Henri Lehtonen (born 1980), Finnish footballer
 Jani Lehtonen (1968–2008), Finnish pole vaulter
 Joel Lehtonen (1881–1934), Finnish author, translator, critic and journalist
 Juho Lehtonen (born 1992), Finnish footballer
 Jukka Lehtonen (born 1982), Finnish volleyball player
 Kari Lehtonen (born 1983), Finnish professional ice hockey goaltender
 Kyösti Lehtonen (1931–1987), Finnish Greco-Roman wrestler
 Lari Lehtonen (born 1987), Finnish cross-country skier
 Marja Lehtonen (born 1968), Finnish professional female bodybuilder and personal trainer
 Mikko Lehtonen, several people
 Mirja Lehtonen (1942–2009), Finnish cross-country skier
 Oskari Lehtonen (1889–1964), Finnish lawyer, bank director and politician
 Pertti Lehtonen (born 1956), Finnish ice hockey player
 Riikka Lehtonen (born 1979), Finnish volleyball player
 Samuel Lehtonen (1921–2010), Finnish Lutheran bishop
 Sauli Lehtonen (1975–1995), Finnish tango singer

As the ending -nen in Finnish last names refers to a diminutive or in common language to something very small like a leaflet as the -nen ending transfers to -let ending and as the start of the surname means a grove in English, in theory unofficially the surname would mean Grovelet in English; a very small grove. But as a word grovelet does not exist in Finnish language as term that people use to refer to a small grove beyond the surname itself so the term would be only used to refer to a person with the surname, it would be smart just to stay on the level of just in theory. Beyond the surname itself a -nen diminutive ending to a surname is one of the most common type of surnames in Finland such as Virtanen, Kekkonen, Korhonen.

Finnish-language surnames